Kalvakuntla Kavitha (born 13 March 1978) Currently serving as the Member of Legislative Council, Nizamabad since 2020. She is a member of Bharat Rashtra Samithi.  She represented as the Member of Parliament of Nizamabad Lok Sabha Constituency from 2014 to 2019. She is the daughter of Chief Minister of Telangana, K. Chandrasekhar Rao.

Early life and education 
Kalvakuntla Kavitha was born in Karimnagar to Chandrashekhar Rao and Shobha. Her father is leader of Telangana Movement and first chief minister of Telangana state. Her father is from Chinthamadaka village in Siddipet District, Telangana.

She has done her B.Tech in CSE from VNR Vignana Jyothi Institute of Engineering and Technology and completed Master of Sciences from University of Southern Mississippi. Later, she worked as a software engineer in the USA before returning to India in 2004 with a vision to work for people of Telangana.

Kavitha is married to Devanapalli Anil Kumar, a Businessman. They have two sons, Aaditya and Aarya.

Career 
After her marriage, In 2003, Kavitha moved to the US with her husband. In 2006, She came back to India to help her father in various ways. In 2014, the new state of Telangana was carved out of Andhra Pradesh and Kavitha's father was the leader of the movement for statehood. In the election of May 2014, her father's party swept the Telangana seats both for the state assembly and the national parliament and her father became the first Chief Minister of Telangana. Kavitha remained in India to help him in various ways. She lost Lok Sabha election 2019 from Nizamabad to a BJP candidate Arvind Dharmapuri.

Early public life
In 2006, the Telangana movement got a fresh impetus with the resignation of its leader K Chandrashekhar Rao from the Union Cabinet to express his strong dissent with the Central Government for going back on the promise of Telangana State formation.

This inspired millions of people from Telangana, who left their careers to join the movement. Motivated by the commitment and sacrifices made by the movement's leader and others who joined the movement, Kavitha plunged herself in the people's movement.

To get a first hand knowledge of the problems affecting the people, Kavitha traveled the length and breadth of Telangana, touring the most remote villages. This journey led to a paradigm shift in Kavitha's understanding of society in general and Telangana.

The magnitude of poverty,  lack of basic needs like power, potable and irrigated water, unemployment and related exploitation moved her.

Telangana Jagruthi 
Despite the despair in Telangana, Kavitha observed, Telangana people had a great love and enthusiasm for indigenous art and culture across all sections. Kavitha believed that love for indigenous arts, could be a common thread to bind all sections of the society together. Bathukamma was one of the unique festivals, which is connected to the hearts of people of Telangana. By celebrating Bathukamma on a large scale and involving people from all sections of the society, she aimed to instill a sense of pride in their own culture.

Drawing Inspiration from the ongoing people's movement for the statehood of Telangana and a strong desire to work for the welfare of the people, led Kavitha to the formation of Telangana Jagruthi in August 2006. However, the organization was formally registered in November 2007. The word Jagruthi means Awakening. Awakening the Telangana society to a renewed sense of pride & unity was the goal. As the name Jagruthi implies, Kavitha believed in bringing the women & youth of Telangana together by instilling a sense of pride to celebrate the rich cultural heritage of the region.

Telangana Jagruthi played a key role in mobilizing the support of women and youth and also large sections of the society which acted as a force multiplier in the peaceful and non violent struggle for Telangana Statehood.

Telangana Jagruthi Skill Centers 
K. Kavitha took an initiative to skill the youth of Telangana for making them ready for the gainful employment. Currently Telangana Jagruthi Skill Centers are imparting training to 8500 students across Telangana and assist them in placements.

Bathukamma
Kavithamma - as local people call her, is often identified with Bathukamma, a floral festival of Telangana. Kavitha worked for decade via Telangana Jagruthi and arranged organized celebrations of Bathukamma in Telangana and globally. Now Bathukamma is celebrated in more than 30 countries.

Labour and Trade Unions 
Kavitha is actively involved in labour and trade unions. Currently she serves in the following Labour and Trade Unions.
 Honorary President  -  Telangana Rashtra Vidyut Karmika Sangham - TRVKS - Electricity Employees Union.
Honorary President  -   Telangana Anganwadi Workers and Helpers Association - TAWHA -  An organization of Anganwadi workers.

Bharat Scouts and Guides 
K Kavitha has been elected the first state chief commissioner of Telangana chapter of Bharat Scouts and Guides (BS & G) Association. With her appointment as state chief commissioner, Kavitha became the youngest person to hold this position in the country. She is also the only second woman state chief commissioner in India. She formally took charge at the investiture ceremony held at the BSG state headquarters at Domalguda.

Political career 
After the formation of Telangana state in 2014, Kavitha contested general elections from Nizamabad Lok Sabha constituency and won with over 1,64,184 vote majority.  As she took active leadership in the protests and demonstrations that were organized in support of the statehood movement all across Telangana. These struggles brought her closer to the people. Her massive electoral victory stood as a testimonial as a people's person and a household name.

As an MP, in Parliament and public life, Kavitha passionately espouses the cause of Telangana as well as other national issues. Kavitha also contested as an MP 2019 general elections from Nizamabad. She lost to Arvind Dharmapuri with a margin of 70,875 votes.

Kavitha is elected as Member of Legislative Council from Nizamabad Local Authorities' Constituency in October 2020 in the bypoll, which was held after the disqualification of the then sitting member R Bhoopati Reddy. Kavitha had secured 728 votes out of the total 823. Kavitha was elected unopposed from Nizamabad Local Authorities constituency in the biennial polls to the Telangana Legislative Council held in December 2021 for the second time. She took oath as MLC on 19 January 2022.

Parliamentary Committee 
In the Parliament, Kavitha is a member of the Estimates Committee, the Standing Committee on Commerce and also on the Consultative Committee, Ministry of Rural Development, Panchayati Raj and Drinking water and Sanitation.

Commonwealth Parliamentary Association  
Recently, Kavitha has been nominated to the Steering Committee of Commonwealth Women Parliamentarians (CWP) India Region. Commonwealth Women Parliamentarians works for increasing the women representatives in Parliaments.

Parliamentary Delegation 
Kavitha has traveled to many countries and officially she was a part of the Vice President's Delegation to Cambodia and Laos as well as with Lok Sabha Speaker's delegation to the European Parliament to Brussels, Belgium.

References

External links

 K.Kavitha Official site

Telugu politicians
Telangana Rashtra Samithi politicians
Living people
1978 births
Women in Telangana politics
India MPs 2014–2019
Lok Sabha members from Telangana
People from Nizamabad district
21st-century Indian women politicians
21st-century Indian politicians